The Faroe Islands league system is a series of interconnected leagues for club football in the Faroe Islands. As of 2018 there are 48 participating men's teams and 15 women's teams in the football league.

The system

Below shows how the current system, as of 2018, works. For each division, its English name, official name or sponsorship name (which often differs radically from its official name) and number of clubs is given. Each division promotes to the division(s) that lie directly above them and relegates to the division(s) that lie directly below them.

Men's leagues

Cup competitions
Faroe Islands Cup
Faroe Islands Super Cup

Women's leagues

Cup competitions
Faroese Women's Cup

References

External links
Faroe Islands FA

Faroe Islands